Cuthonella berghi is a species of sea slug, an aeolid nudibranch, a marine gastropod mollusc in the family Cuthonellidae.

Distribution

References

Cuthonellidae
Gastropods described in 1902